Red Onion is an unincorporated community in Crawford County, Kansas, United States.

History
Red Onion was known historically for its coal mining operations.

Geography
Red Onion is located in Crawford County, Kansas, and situated 860 feet above sea level.

References

Further reading

External links
 Crawford County maps: Current, Historic, KDOT

Unincorporated communities in Crawford County, Kansas
Unincorporated communities in Kansas